The 1893 Harvard Crimson football team represented Harvard University in the 1893 college football season. The Crimson finished with an 11–1 record. The team won its first 10 games but lost to Yale in the 11th game of the season by a 6–0 score.

Schedule

References

Harvard
Harvard Crimson football seasons
Harvard Crimson football